Cierra Runge (born March 7, 1996) is an American competition swimmer.

Career
Runge was born in Cochranville, Pennsylvania, to Scott and Diane Runge. She is a 2014 graduate of Octorara High School. She was on the Jennersville YMCA swim team when she was younger (Now KJAY Swim Team). She attended the University of California, Berkeley her freshman year under Teri McKeever and afterwards took a whole year off to focus her efforts on making the 2016 U.S. Olympic team. Runge came back to collegiate swimming attending the University of Wisconsin-Madison, where she swam for head coach Whitney Hite. For her last two years of NCAA eligibility, she transferred to Arizona State University, where she worked with Bob Bowman.

At the 2012 United States Olympic Trials in Omaha, Nebraska, Runge placed 25th in the 100-meter freestyle and 26th in the 50-meter freestyle.

In 2013, she competed at the World Junior Swimming Championships and won four medals including gold in the 4x200-meter freestyle relay.

At the 2014 US National Championships, the qualifying meet for both the 2014 Pan Pacific Swimming Championships and the 2015 World Aquatics Championships, she finished second in the 400- and 800-meter freestyle, and 6th in the 200-meter freestyle.

At the 2014 Pan Pacific Swimming Championships in Gold Coast, Australia, Runge placed 2nd in the 400-meter freestyle, 4th in the 1500-meter freestyle, and 5th in the 800-meter freestyle. In the 400-meter freestyle, she finished behind teammate Katie Ledecky, who set a world record.

She most recently won a gold medal in the 2016 Rio Olympic Games in the 4 x 200 freestyle relay.

References

External links
 
 
 
 
 
 
  Cierra Runge – University of California athlete profile at CalBears.com
 

1996 births
Living people
American female freestyle swimmers
California Golden Bears women's swimmers
Wisconsin Badgers women's swimmers
Arizona State Sun Devils women's swimmers
World Aquatics Championships medalists in swimming
Swimmers at the 2016 Summer Olympics
People from Chester County, Pennsylvania
Sportspeople from Pennsylvania
Olympic gold medalists for the United States in swimming
Medalists at the 2016 Summer Olympics